The Victory Cross (Asturian and Spanish: Cruz de la Victoria) is an early 10th century Asturian  crux gemmata or jewelled cross, given by King Alfonso III of Asturias, who reigned from 866 to 910, to the Cathedral of San Salvador of Oviedo (Asturias, Spain). 
It was made in 908 in the Castle of Gauzón (Raices Viejo, Castrillón, Asturias).
At the core is an oakwood cross, in legend identified with a cross carried by King Pelagius of Asturias at the Battle of Covadonga. 

Since December 1990, the flag of modern Principality of Asturias bears the Victory Cross offset towards the hoist.

History

According to legend, the primitive, undecorated wooden core of this cross was carried against the Muslims of al-Andalus by King Pelagius of Asturias at the Battle of Covadonga,  later kept by his son Favila of Asturias in the Church of Santa Cruz de Cangas de Onís, erected by Favila and his wife Froiluba in 737, and dedicated to the True Cross in Cangas de Onís, the first capital of the Kingdom of Asturias. 

However, a 2010 study has radiocarbon dated the cross to the late 9th century, roughly contemporary  to the ornate casing. 

The ornate casing contains 152 gems and imitation gems. An inscription tells us that this casing was made at the Castle of Gauzón in Asturias in 908. Alfonso III donated this important Pre-Romanesque gold artifact to Cathedral of Oviedo to commemorate a hundred years of the Asturian kingdom's victories and conquests.

During the Spanish Civil War, the Cross, like the rest of the artifacts in the Cámara Sancta, suffered serious damages which required its restoration. 
The Victoria Cross recovered its gems from 1942 on, thanks to popular donations for the acquisition and restoration of the relic. However, the work of goldsmiths Horacio Rivero Alvarez and Luis Aguilar did not consider the original design, altering the position of the medallion on both fronts. In 1971 new enamels were placed by German goldsmith Werner Henneberger, but here again the original design was not taken sufficiently into account.

On 9 August 1977, the Cross, together with Agate box and the Cross of the Angels, were stolen and suffered serious damage after the thieves tore their precious stones and gold plating. Its current appearance is the result of careful reconstruction carried out in 1978.

Description
The whole cross is covered with gold leaf and filigree, and richly decorated especially the anverse, covered with coloured enamel, pearls, precious stones and gold thread. The reverse shows an inscription in soldered gold letters, mentioning the donors to the Church of San Salvador, King Alfonso II and Queen Jimena, and the place (Gauzón Castle) and the year it was made:

Notes

References

External links

 Official website of the Ayuntamiento of Oviedo

Asturian culture
Crux gemmata
Pelagius of Asturias
Religion in Asturias
Spanish art
Crosses in heraldry
Processional crosses